Henry Louis Dyer (born January 28, 1945) is a former American football running back in the National Football League for the Los Angeles Rams and the Washington Redskins. He played college football at Grambling State University and was drafted in the fourth round of the 1966 NFL Draft.

1945 births
Living people
Players of American football from Baton Rouge, Louisiana
American football running backs
Grambling State Tigers football players
Los Angeles Rams players
Washington Redskins players